The Mayor of Westport officiated over the borough of Westport in on the West Coast of New Zealand's South Island. The office was created in 1873 when Westport was gazetted as a borough by the Nelson Provincial Council, and ceased with the 1989 local government reforms, when Westport Borough, Buller County and Inangahua County merged to form Buller District. The first mayor of Westport was James Wilson Humphrey.

List of mayors
The following is a complete list of the mayors of Westport:

References

Westport
Westport